The women's doubles Tournament at the 1993 Matrix Essentials Evert Cup took place between February 22 and February 29 on the outdoor hard courts of the Indian Wells Tennis Garden in Indian Wells, United States. Rennae Stubbs and Helena Suková won the title, defeating Ann Grossman and Patricia Hy in the final.

Seeds

Draw

Finals

Top half

Bottom half

References
 Main Draw

Matrix Essentials Evert Cup Doubles